Paige Audrey-Marie Hurd (born July 20, 1992) is an American actress of mixed African American and Puerto Rican heritage. She is best known for her recurring role as Tasha Clarkson on the CW sitcom Everybody Hates Chris, Samantha Grover in Hawaii Five-O (2013-2020), Gayle Franklin in The Oval (2019-present), and Lauren Baldwin in Power Book II: Ghost (2020-present).

Early life and education
Hurd was born in Dallas, Texas. She was born to an African American father and a Puerto Rican mother. The late rapper DMX was her godfather.

Career
Hurd portrayed Tasha, next-door neighbor of Chris (Tyler James Williams), in the Chris Rock-produced TV show Everybody Hates Chris. Hurd played DMX's daughter in Cradle 2 the Grave, a 2003 film starring Jet Li. Paige appeared as Denise in The Cat in the Hat, a 2003 family-comedy film loosely based on the 1957 book of the same name, by Dr. Seuss.

Hurd was featured in the 2005 comedy Beauty Shop,  which starred Queen Latifah.

Hurd appeared in Jasmine Villegas's music video for "I Own This" and Steph Jones's music video for "Beautiful." She was Justin Bieber's love interest in the music video of "Never Let You Go." She was featured in Romeo Miller's music video "Mistletoe". Hurd started her acting career training with Dallas Young Actors Studio, directed by Linda Seto. She is starring in a new movie called "Crosstown" with well-known actors and actresses such as Vivica A. Fox. She was also featured in two of singer Trevante's music videos "Be Your First" and "Forever." In 2014, Paige starred in G-Eazy's music video for the single "I Mean It." And in 2012, she participated in the music video of Nas titled "Daughters".

In 2019, she began starring as one of the lead roles in the hit show Tyler Perry's The Oval where she plays as the first daughter "Gayle Franklin" who is rebellious and a wild child. She is not related to actress Michelle Hurd.

Filmography

References

External links
 
 EURweb
 Actress Paige Hurd’s BDay benefits cancer patients (The Insider)

1992 births
African-American actresses
American actresses of Puerto Rican descent
American television actresses
Living people
Actresses from Texas
People from Dallas
American child actresses
21st-century American actresses
21st-century African-American women
21st-century African-American people